The 1922 United States Senate election in Indiana took place on November 7, 1922. Incumbent Republican U.S. Senator Harry Stewart New ran for re-election to a second term in office, but was defeated in the Republican primary by former Republican Senator Albert J. Beveridge. In the general election, Beveridge was defeated by Democratic former Governor of Indiana Samuel M. Ralston.

Republican primary

Candidates
Albert Beveridge, former U.S. Senator (1899–1911)
Harry Stewart New, incumbent Senator since 1917

Results

Democratic primary

Candidates
 Charles F. Howard
Samuel M. Ralston, former Governor of Indiana (1913–17)
 Jesse A. Sanders
 Bernard B. Shively
 Daniel W. Simms

Results

General election

Results

See also 
 1922 United States Senate elections

References

Indiana
1922
United States Senate